Naren Hansda was an Indian politician from West Bengal belonging to Jharkhand Party (Naren). He was the founder of Jharkhand Party (Naren).

Biography
Hansda's wife Chunibala Hansda is a former member of the West Bengal Legislative Assembly and their daughter Birbaha Hansda is a Santali film actress.

Hansda was elected as a member of the West Bengal Legislative Assembly as a Jharkhand Party candidate from Binpur in 1991. Later, he quit Jharkhand Party and founded Jharkhand Party (Naren). He was elected as a member of the West Bengal Legislative Assembly as a Jharkhand Party candidate from Binpur in 1996.

Hansda died on 25 June 1999.

References

1999 deaths
Jharkhand Party (Naren) politicians
People from Jhargram district
Santali people
West Bengal MLAs 1991–1996
West Bengal MLAs 1996–2001
Year of birth missing